is a Japanese manga series written and illustrated by Cocomi. It was serialized in the semi-monthly manga magazine Canna from 2016 to 2018. The book was followed up with a one-volume sequel spin-off titled . A live-action film adaptation was released on September 4, 2020.

Plot

After being fired from his office job in Tokyo, Mitsuomi Kozaka returns to his hometown for the first time since leaving the countryside in 10 years. As he struggles to win back the approval of his family and his community, he meets Yamato Kumai, a young man adopted by one of his neighbors during his time away.

Media

Manga

Restart After Come Back Home is written and illustrated by Cocomi. The series was initially published as a short story in vol. 51 of the semi-monthly manga anthology Canna, which was released on December 22, 2016. Cocomi continued the series beginning in vol. 53 of Canna, which was released on April 21, 2017, where it was serialized sporadically until vol. 61 of Canna, released on August 28, 2018. The chapters were later released in one bound volumes by France Shoin under the Canna Comics imprint.

Following the series' release, a sequel titled Restart After Growing Hungry began serialization in Canna beginning with vol. 69. The story takes place 4 years after the events of Restart After Coming Back Home.

On May 21, 2021, Seven Seas Entertainment announced that they had licensed both books in English for North American distribution.

Film

A live-action film adaptation was announced in April 2020, starring Yuki Furukawa as Mitsuomi Kozuka and Ryo Ryusei as Yamato. The film is releasing in theaters on September 4, 2020. The film is directed by Ryuta Inoue in his directorial debut and written by Kumiko Sato. Additional cast members include Eri Murakawa, Gaku Sano, Hiroko Nakajima, Yukijirō Hotaru, Masahiro Komoto, and Rena Miura.

References

2016 manga
Boys' love films
LGBT in anime and manga
Live-action films based on manga
Manga adapted into films
Yaoi anime and manga
2010s LGBT literature
Seven Seas Entertainment titles
2020 films
2020 LGBT-related films
Japanese romantic drama films
Japanese LGBT-related films
LGBT-related romantic drama films